You're Gonna Miss It All (stylized as "you're gonna miss it all") is the second studio album by American emo band Modern Baseball.

Background
Like their debut album Sports (2012), You're Gonna Miss It All was written while the band members were attending college. Unlike Sports which only featured Lukens and Ewald, "we were just excited to have a full band and make [You're Gonna Miss It All] that way", according to Ewald. Discussing writing, Ewald said one member of the group would come up with a lyric "and we'll go run off by ourselves and try to build around that".

Release
On December 10, 2013, You're Gonna Miss It All was announced for release in February 2014, revealing its track listing. In addition, "Your Graduation" was made available for streaming. Later in December, the group performed a few shows with Bayside, immediately followed by a small number of shows with The Hundred Acre Woods & The Color and Sound in January 2014. You're Gonna Miss It All was made available for streaming on February 4 via Pitchfork, before being released on February 11 through Run for Cover Records. On March 6, a music video was released for "Your Graduation". In March and April, the group supported The Wonder Years on their North American headlining tour. In May, the band supported Real Friends on their tour of the UK and Europe. In June, the group went on a headlining US tour with support from Tiny Moving Parts, the Hotelier and Sorority Noise.

On August 27, a music video was released for "Pothole". In September, the group played a handful of US shows with I Am the Avalanche and Beach Slang, culminating in an appearance at Riot Fest. Following this, the group went on a headlining UK tour with support from Spraynard, Chewing on Tinfoil and Losing Sleep. "Your Graduation" was released as a single on September 29. In October, the group supported The Wonder Years on their headlining US tour. In November and December, the band went on a US tour alongside Knuckle Puck, Crying and Somos with additional support from Walter Mitty and His Makeshift Orchestra, Foxing and Hostage Calm on specific dates. In June and July 2015, the group supported Say Anything on their headlining US tour.

Reception

It reached No. 97 on the US Billboard 200 and No. 15 on US Alternative Albums. By September 2014, the album had sold over 12,000 copies worldwide. By May 2016, the album had sold almost 30,000 copies in the U.S.

"Your Graduation" appeared on a best-of emo songs list by Vulture.

Track listing

Personnel

Modern Baseball 
Bren Lukens – lead vocals, guitar, engineer, producer, layout
Jacob Ewald – lead vocals, guitar, engineer, producer, layout
Ian Farmer – bass, backing vocals, engineer, producer
Sean Huber – drums, vocals, engineer, producer

Additional personnel 
William Lindsay – lap steel guitar (track 6)

Production 
Craig Donatucci – cover photo
Patrick Loundas – drum engineering
Jonathan Low – mixing
Allison Newbold – photography
Will Yip – mastering

Chart performance

References
Citations

Sources

 
 

2014 albums
Run for Cover Records albums
Modern Baseball albums